The 1910 Calgary municipal election was held on December 12, 1910 to elect a Mayor and twelve Aldermen to sit on the twenty-seventh Calgary City Council from January 2, 1911 to January 2, 1912. Nominations closed on December 6, 1910.

The elected council was the first Calgary City Council to occupy the new Calgary City Hall.

Background
The election was held under multiple non-transferable vote where each elector was able to cast a ballot for the mayor and up to three ballots for separate councillors with a voter's designated ward. Ward 3 Alderman John William Mitchell defeated Ward 4 Alderman and future Lieutenant Governor of Alberta Dr. William Egbert for the position of Mayor. Egbert attributed his loss to disorganization and voted to never again re-enter municipal politics.

The Morning Albertan claimed Jamison's defeat for Commissioner was due to his announcement for the position, his association with Canadian Pacific Railway, the Elbow River powerplant and Clarke's good standing in the public. Egbert's defeat was linked to his association with Jamison and his support for the Elbow River powerplant.

Results

Mayor

Commissioner

Councillors

Ward 1

Ward 2

Ward 3

Ward 4

School Boards

Public School Board
Robert J. Hutchings - acclaimed
Frederick William Mapson - acclaimed
James Short - acclaimed

Separate School Board
P.J. Morrow - acclaimed
J.G. O'Gara - acclaimed

By-elections
Ward 1 Alderman Adoniram Judson Samis withdrew his seat on January 3, 1911 after technicalities with a mortgage which invalided his candidacy. Samis moved the mortgage into his wife's name and announced his candidacy again. Samis won the by-election against opponent E. Doughty by a total of 621-405. The by-election campaign was spirited, culminating in a fight between candidate Samis and Conrad Pohl, an agent of Doughty two days before the vote.

Ward 2 Alderman William Thomas Daniel Lathwell resigned from City Council which was accepted on March 7, 1911, owing to pressure from local business groups and lack of time. Harold William Hounsfield Riley was acclaimed at close of nominations on March 20, 1911 as Alderman.

See also
List of Calgary municipal elections

References

Municipal elections in Calgary
1910 elections in Canada
1910s in Calgary